Worldwide Day of Play was an annual event on the Nickelodeon cable channel, designed to encourage children and parents to turn off the television and play together, especially outdoors. The yearly event officially began on October 2, 2004, and has been broadcast on all US Nickelodeon channels: Nickelodeon, Nick GAS, Noggin and The N, Nicktoons, Nick Jr., TeenNick, and NickMusic. The event was designed as a finale for Nick's six-month-long Let's Just Play campaign. In addition, Nick.com would also have special features for children to learn how to stay active and healthy.

Since the late 2000s, an international version of the event has also been broadcast on counterparts in Germany, Benelux, Greece, Poland and Russia.

The most recent event was held in 2019.

General purpose
The event encourages children to think about getting away from the TV and being physically active. Schools and educational organizations have also been encouraged to host events around this theme.

From 2007 to 2017, Nickelodeon suspended programming on WWDoP across all of its TV channels–Nickelodeon, Nick Jr., Nicktoons and TeenNick– and websites from 12 p.m. to 3 p.m. (ET/PT) (where TV grid listings have this listed as "Off air" or "Worldwide Day of Play") urging kids to “get up, go outside and play.”  According to Viacom, the owner of the Nickelodeon networks, millions of children and adults are expected to participate in "thousands of events in dozens of countries."

When the Let's Just Play campaign ended in September, Nickelodeon aired the finale during the last Saturday of September, the "Worldwide Day of Play". Nickelodeon and its sister channels suspend programming for three hours from 12 Noon to 3PM ET/PT. During the time there was no programming, a special message would appear on the screen. There was no Let's Just Play campaign in 2008, though the Day of Play was held that year.

Nickelodeon's fifteenth WWDoP took place on September 29, 2018, but the Nick networks no longer used the "Off-Air" screens. The 2019 event is the most recent event to be held.

New episodes of Nickelodeon series
After Nickelodeon resumes airing, they usually air marathons and premieres of TeenNick series, or SpongeBob SquarePants. In 2008, SpongeBob SquarePants, alongside Just Jordan, Tak and the Power of Juju, Zoey 101, iCarly, and Back at the Barnyard, had new episodes.  Following in 2008 was the season premiere of iCarly and the finale of My Family's Got GUTS. Following in 2009 and 2010, iCarly, True Jackson, VP, and Big Time Rush had new episodes, with the inclusion of Nickelodeon's rebrand. Later followed in 2011, new episodes of iCarly, Big Time Rush and Supah Ninjas aired. In 2012, before the Worldwide Day of Play begin, new episodes of Teenage Mutant Ninja Turtles and Kung Fu Panda: Legends of Awesomeness aired as well with an hour-long final season premiere of "iCarly" later that night with a sneak peek of See Dad Run following iCarly. For 2013, new episodes of Sanjay and Craig and Rabbids Invasion aired prior to the event, while premieres of Sam & Cat and The Haunted Hathaways were shown that evening. In 2014, new episodes of Sanjay and Craig and Breadwinners were shown prior to the event, while new episodes of The Haunted Hathaways, Henry Danger, Nicky, Ricky, Dicky & Dawn, The Thundermans, and AwesomenessTV were shown in the evening. In 2015, new episodes of Henry Danger, Game Shakers, and 100 Things To Do Before High School had aired that evening. In 2016, season premieres of Henry Danger, Game Shakers, & School Of Rock had aired that evening. In 2017, new episodes of Henry Danger and Game Shakers had aired that evening. In 2018, a new episode of Henry Danger aired that evening. In 2019, Part 2 of 2-Part final season premiere of Henry Danger and All That aired that evening.

Appearances
Special appearances were arranged for the Worldwide Day of Play. Guests have included first lady Michelle Obama. Some of the guests were included of its cast from original Nickelodeon shows including Power Rangers: Samurai and Big Time Rush.

References

Nickelodeon
Play (activity)
Recurring events established in 2004
Recurring events disestablished in 2019
Annual television shows